Roy McCormack (born 12 February 1949) was a Scottish footballer who played for Dumbarton, Dundee, Airdrie and  East Stirling.

References

1949 births
Scottish footballers
Dumbarton F.C. players
East Stirlingshire F.C. players
Dundee F.C. players
Airdrieonians F.C. (1878) players
Scottish Football League players
Living people
Association football forwards